Glossogobius matanensis is a species of goby endemic to Sulawesi, Indonesia where it is only known from Lake Matano, Lake Mahalona and Lake Towuti.  This species can reach a length of  TL.

References

matanensis
Freshwater fish of Sulawesi
Taxonomy articles created by Polbot
Fish described in 1913